José Aguayo (born 25 October 1955) is a Peruvian footballer. He played in five matches for the Peru national football team in 1983. He was also part of Peru's squad for the 1983 Copa América tournament.

References

1955 births
Living people
Peruvian footballers
Peru international footballers
Place of birth missing (living people)
Association football defenders